Campbell Bonner (30 January 1876 - 11 July 1954) was an American classicist notable for his research of amulets and ancient popular religion and superstitions of the late Graeco-Roman pagan and early Christian world.

Publications 
 "The Danaid Myth," TAPA 31 (1900) 27-36
 "A Study of the Danaid Myth," HSCP 13 (1902) 129-73
 "Dionysiac Magic and the Greek Land of Cockaigne," TAPA 41 (1910) 175-85
 "The Prenuptial Rite in the Aetia of Callimachus," CP 6 (1911) 402-9
 "The Sacred Bond," TAPA 44 (1913) 233-45
 "A Papyrus Describing Magical Powers," TAPA 52 (1921) 111-8
 "A Papyrus of Dioscurides in the University of Michigan Collection," TAPA 53 (1922) 142-68
 "Traces of Thaumaturgic Technique in the Miracles," HThR 20 (1927) 171-81
 "The Numerical Value of a Magical Formula," JEA 16 (1930) 6-9
 "Note on the Paris Magical Papyrus," CP 25 (1930) 180-3
 "Demons of the Bath," in Studies Presented to F.L.C. Griffith (London, 1932): 203ff.
 "Witchcraft in the Lecture Room of Libanius," TAPA 63 (1932) 34-44
 "Liturgical Fragments on Gnostic Amulets," HThR 25 (1932) 362-7
 A Papyrus Codex of the Shepherdof Hermas (Ann Arbor, 1933)
 "A Supplement to Preisendanz' 'Amuletum Ineditum'," BNGJhb 9 (1933) 375-6
 "An Ikon of St. Demetrius," AJA 47 (1934) 63-77
 "Pallados and Jewish Reflections upon the Beginning of Man," JAOS 55 (1935) 196-9
 The Last Chapters of Enoch in Greek with the collaboration of H. C. Youtie (London & Toronto, 1937)
 "Two Curse Tablets from Beisan" with H. C. Youtie, TAPA 68 (1937) 43–77, 128
 "Some Phases of Religious Feeling in Later Paganism," HThR 30 (1937) 119-40
 "Hades and the Pomegranate Seed (Hymn to Demeter 372-4),'* CR 53 (1939) 3-4
 The Homily on the Passion by Melito, Bishop of Sardis (London & Philadelphia, 1940)
 "A New Historical Fragment," TAPA 72 (1941) 26-35
 "Two Studies in Syncretistic Amulets," PAPS 85 (1942) 466-71
 "Aeolus figured on Colic Amulets," HThR 35 (1942) 87-93
 "The Techniques of Exorcism," HThR 36 (1943) 39–49; and "Correction," HThR 37 (1944) 334ff.
 "An Obscure Inscription on a Gold Tablet," Hesperia 13 (1944) 36-55
 "The Philinna Papyrus and the Gold Tablet from the Vigna Codini," Hesperia 13 (1944) 349-51
 Studies in Magical Amulets, Chiefly Graeco-Egyptian (Ann Arbor, 1950)
 "A Reminiscence of Paul on a Coin Amulet," HThR 43 (1950) 165-8
 "Amulets Chiefly in the British Museum," Hesperia 20 (1951) 301-45
 "A Magical Inscription on a Chalcedony," with H. C. Youtie, TAPA 84 (1953) 60-6
 "Two Notes," JEA 40 (1954) 15-8
 "A Miscellany of Engraved Stones," Hesperia 23 (1954) 138-57 and plates 34-6
 "A Note on Method in the Treatment of Magical Inscriptions," AJP 75 (1954) 303–5.

References

External links 
 http://cbd.mfab.hu/glossary/2056

1876 births
1954 deaths
Classical philologists
Vanderbilt University alumni
Harvard University alumni
American classical scholars
People from Nashville, Tennessee
Corresponding Fellows of the British Academy
University of Michigan faculty